Finders Keepers is a 1990 science fiction novel by Australian author Emily Rodda. In 1991, it won the Children's Book Council of Australia's Book of the Year for Younger Readers.

References

1990 Australian novels
1990 fantasy novels
1990 science fiction novels
Books by Jennifer Rowe
Omnibus Books books